Clayton is the name of some places in the U.S. state of Wisconsin:

Clayton, Crawford County, Wisconsin, a town
Clayton, Polk County, Wisconsin a town
Clayton, Winnebago County, Wisconsin, a town
Clayton (village), Wisconsin in Polk County, a village